Taqi Kandi (also Romanized as Taqī Kandī; also known as Mīāndraq) is a village in Gharbi Rural District, in the Central District of Ardabil County, Ardabil Province, Iran. At the 2006 census, its population was 54 in 18 families.

References 

Towns and villages in Ardabil County